This is a list of historical events and publications of Australian literature during 2020.

Major publications

Literary fiction 
Patrick Allington, Rise & Shine
Robbie Arnott, The Rain Heron
James Bradley, Ghost Species
Trent Dalton, All Our Shimmering Skies
Jon Doust, Return Ticket
Chris Flynn, Mammoth
Anna Goldsworthy, Melting Moments
Kate Grenville, A Room Made of Leaves
Tom Keneally, The Dickens Boy
Sofie Laguna, Infinite Splendours
Bem Le Hunte,  Elephants with Headlights
Carol Lefevre, Murmurations
Amanda Lohrey, The Labyrinth
Laura Jean McKay, The Animals in That Country
Ronnie Scott, The Adversary
Craig Silvey, Honeybee
Pip Williams, The Dictionary of Lost Words
Daniel Davis Wood, At the Edge of the Solid World
Evie Wyld, The Bass Rock

Children's and young adult fiction 
 K.M. Allan, Blackbirch: The Beginning
 Sarah Allen, Busy Beaks
 Davina Bell, The End of the World Is Bigger than Love
 Danielle Binks, The Year the Maps Changed
 Belinda Crawford, Cold Between Stars
 Katya de Becerra, Oasis
 Alex Dyson, When It Drops
 Sarah Epstein, Deep Water
 Alison Evans, Euphoria Kids
 Zana Fraillon, The Lost Soul Atlas
 Jane Godwin, When Rain Turns to Snow
 Kate Gordon, Aster's Good, Right Things
 Sophie Gonzales, Only Mostly Devastated
 Bernadette Green, Who's Your Real Mum?
 Libby Hathorn and Lisa Hathorn-Jarman, No! Never!
 Eliza Henry-Jones, How to Grow a Family Tree
 Gina Inverarity, Snow
 Kay Kerr, Please Don't Hug Me
 Will Kostakis
 Rebel Gods
 The Greatest Hit
Jeremy Lachlan, Jane Doe and the Key of All Souls
 Ellie Marney, None Shall Sleep
 Anna McGregor, Anemone Is Not The Enemy
 Heidi McKinnon, There's No Such Thing
 Kate McMahon, Sea of Gratitude
 Cath Moore, Metal Fish, Falling Snow
 Anna Morgan, Before the Beginning
 Jaclyn Moriarty, The Stolen Prince of Cloudburst
 Sally Murphy, Worse Things
 Katrina Nannestad, We Are Wolves
 Christie Nieman, Where We Begin
 Garth Nix, The Left-Handed Booksellers of London 
 Poppy Nwosu, Taking Down Evelyn Tait 
 Kate O'Donnell, This One is Ours 
 Kirli Saunders, Bindi 
 Helen Scheuerer, Dawn of Mist 
 Astrid Scholte, The Vanishing Deep 
 Briony Stewart, We Love You, Magoo 
Shaun Tan, Dog
Jessica Townsend, Hollowpox: The Hunt for Morrigan Crow
Lisa Walker, The Girl with the Gold Bikini
Anna Whateley, Peta Lyre's Rating Normal
Sue Whiting, The Book of Chance
Bonnie Wynne, The Ninth Sorceress

Crime 
 Anne Buist, The Long Shadow
 Candice Fox, Gathering Dark
 Dervla McTiernan, The Good Turn

Science Fiction and Fantasy
 Max Barry, Providence

Poetry 
Laurie Duggan, Homer Street
Michael Farrell, Family Trees
 Kate Llewellyn, Harbour
Felicity Plunkett, A Kinder Sea
Ellen van Neerven 
Homeland Calling: Words from a new generation of Aboriginal and Torres Strait Islander voices (as editor)
Throat

Non-fiction 
Julia Baird, Phosphorescence: On awe, wonder and things that sustain you when the world goes dark
Richard Fidler, The Golden Maze: A History of Prague
Michael Gawenda, The Powerbroker: Mark Leibler, an Australian Life
Eddie Jaku,  The Happiest Man on Earth
John Kinsella, Displaced: A Rural Life
Michael Gawenda, The Powerbroker: Mark Leibler, an Australian
 Sophie McNeill, We Can't Say We Didn't Know: Dispatches from an age of impunity
 Brenda Niall, Friends and Rivals: Four Great Australian Writers: Barbara Baynton, Ethel Turner, Nettie Palmer, Henry Handel Richardson 
 Caroline Overington, Missing William Tyrrell
 Christopher Pyne, The Insider: The scoops, the scandals and the serious business within the Canberra bubble
 Cassandra Pybus, Truganini: Journey Through the Apocalypse
 Miranda Tapsell, Top End Girl
 Robert Tickner, Ten Doors Down: The Story of an Extraordinary Adoption Reunion
Malcolm Turnbull, A Bigger Picture

Awards and honours

Note: these awards were presented in the year in question.

Lifetime achievement

Fiction

National

Children and Young Adult

National

Crime and Mystery

National

Science Fiction

Non-Fiction

Poetry

Drama

Deaths

 1 January – Alexander Frater, 82, travel writer and journalist
 6 January – Timoshenko Aslanides, 76, poet
 20 January – Steph Bowe, 25, young adult novelist and blogger
1 April – Bruce Dawe, 90, poet
14 May – Judith Clarke, 76, writer for children and teenagers
5 June – Andrew Riemer, 84, literary critic and author
10 June – Jesse Blackadder, 56, novelist, screenwriter and journalist
7 July – Elizabeth Harrower, 92, novelist
10 September – Barbara Ker Wilson, 90, English-born Australian editor and novelist
29 September – Ania Walwicz, poet, playwright, prose writer and visual artist
6 November – Gerald Stone, 87, journalist
14 November – Greg Growden, 60, sports journalist, author and biographer
12 December – Wendy Brennan, 80, romantic fiction writer (co-wrote with husband Frank Brennan as Emma Darcy)

See also 
 Literature
 List of years in Australian literature
 List of Australian literary awards

References

Literature
Australian literature by year
Years of the 21st century in Australia
Years of the 21st century in literature